Courtefontaine may refer to two communes in the French region of Franche-Comté:
Courtefontaine, Doubs
Courtefontaine, Jura